Al-Hazim  is a Syrian village located in Al-Hamraa Nahiyah, in the Hama District, Hama.  According to the Syria Central Bureau of Statistics (CBS), al-Hazim had a population of 1,557 at the time of the 2004 Census.

References 

Populated places in Hama District